The 1929–30 Toronto Maple Leafs season was Toronto's 13th season of play in the National Hockey League (NHL).

Offseason

Regular season

Final standings

Record vs. opponents

Schedule and results

Playoffs
The Maple Leafs didn't qualify for the playoffs.

Player statistics

Regular season
Scoring

Goaltending

Awards and records

Transactions

October 7, 1929: Signed Free Agent Charlie Conacher
October 10, 1929: Acquired Gord Brydson from the Buffalo Bisons of the IHL for Carl Voss and Wes King
October 23, 1929: Acquired Cliff McBride from the Montreal Maroons for cash
November 12, 1929: Traded Clem Loughlin to the London Panthers of the IHL for cash
December 6, 1929: Traded Gord Brydson to the London Panthers of the IHL for cash
December 18, 1929: Loaned Benny Grant to the New York Americans for cash
January 24, 1930: Loaned Benny Grant to the Minneapolis Millers of the AHA for cash
January 31, 1930: Acquired Frank Nighbor from the Ottawa Senators for Danny Cox and cash
February 6, 1930: Traded Cliff McBride to the Toronto Falcons of the IHL for cash
February 10, 1930: Signed Free Agent Babe Dye

See also
1929–30 NHL season

References

Toronto Maple Leafs seasons
Toronto
Toronto